Costas Petsas (born 11 April 1961) is a retired Cypriot football defender.

References

1961 births
Living people
Cypriot footballers
AC Omonia players
Association football forwards
Cypriot First Division players
Cyprus international footballers